Corinthian Island is a former island in the San Francisco Bay, that was later attached to the mainland. It is in Marin County, California, by the Tiburon Peninsula. It appears on a 1950 USGS map of the area.

References

Islands of Marin County, California
Islands of San Francisco Bay
Islands of Northern California